Michele Angelo Besso (Riesbach, 25 May 1873 – Geneva, 15 March 1955) was a Swiss-Italian engineer best known for working closely with Albert Einstein.

Biography 
Besso was born in Riesbach from a family of Italian Jewish (Sephardi) descent. He was a close friend of Albert Einstein during his years at the Federal Polytechnic Institute in Zurich, (today known as ETH Zurich) and then at the patent office in Bern, where Einstein helped him to get a job. Besso is credited with introducing Einstein to the works of Ernst Mach, the sceptical critic of physics who influenced Einstein's approach to the discipline. 

Einstein called Besso "the best sounding board in Europe" for scientific ideas. In Einstein's original paper on special relativity, he ended the paper stating, "In conclusion, let me note that my friend and colleague M. Besso steadfastly stood by me in my work on the problem here discussed, and that I am indebted to him for many a valuable suggestion."

Besso died in Geneva, aged 81. In a letter of condolence to the Besso family, Albert Einstein wrote “Now he has departed from this strange world a little ahead of me. That means nothing. For us believing physicists the distinction between past, present, and future only has the meaning of an illusion, though a persistent one.” Einstein died one month and 3 days after his friend, on 18 April 1955.

See also
 Einstein's Dreams
 Genius, a television series depicting Einstein's life

Notes

References
 American Institute of Physics - The Center for History of Physics: Einstein, Image and Impact: The Formative Years, 3
Einstein and Besso:From Zürich to Milano by Christian BRACCO
The Einstein-Besso Manuscript: A Glimpse Behind the Curtain of the Wizard

1873 births
1955 deaths
Swiss engineers
Swiss Sephardi Jews
People from Zürich
Italian Sephardi Jews